The  Oxford Institute for Economic Policy, OXONIA is an independent and non-profit think tank focused on analysis, discussion and dissemination of economic policy issues.  It was founded in 2004.

References

External links
 The Oxford Institute for Economic Policy website

Political and economic think tanks based in the United Kingdom
Non-profit organisations based in the United Kingdom